Bad Education (also meaning 'bad manners') is a 2004 Spanish drama film written and directed by Pedro Almodóvar. Starring Gael García Bernal, Fele Martínez, Daniel Giménez Cacho, Lluís Homar and Francisco Boira, the film focuses on two reunited childhood friends and lovers caught up in a stylised murder mystery. Along with metafiction, sexual abuse by Catholic priests, transsexuality and drug use are also important themes and devices in the plot. The film received an NC-17 rating in the United States for a depiction of homosexual sex.

The film was released on 19 March 2004 in Spain and 10 September 2004 in Mexico. It was also screened at many international film festivals such as Cannes, New York, Moscow and Toronto before its US release on 19 November 2004. The film received critical acclaim, and was seen as a return to Almodovar's dark stage, placing it alongside films such as Matador (1986) and Law of Desire (1987).

Plot
In 1980 Madrid, young film director Enrique Goded is looking for his next project when he receives the unexpected visit of an actor looking for work. The actor claims to be Enrique's boarding school friend and first love, Ignacio Rodriguez. Ignacio, who is now using the name Ángel Andrade, has brought a short story titled "The Visit", hoping that Enrique would be interested in making a film out of it and give her the starring role. Enrique is intrigued since "The Visit" describes their time together at the Catholic boarding school and it also includes a fictionalized account of their reunion many years later as adults.

"The Visit" is set in 1977. It tells the story of a transgender drag queen with the stage name Zahara, whose birth name is Ignacio. Zahara plans to rob a drunken admirer but discovers that the man is her boyhood lover Enrique. Next she visits her old school and confronts Father Manolo, who abused her when she was a boy. She demands one million pesetas from him in exchange for halting publication of her story "The Visit". The story is set in a Catholic boarding school for boys in 1964. At the school, Ignacio, a young boy with a beautiful singing voice, is the object of lust of Father Manolo, the school principal and literature teacher. Ignacio falls in love with a young Enrique, and the two go the local cinema and grope each other. Manolo discovers them together that night. Although Ignacio allows Manolo to molest him in exchange for not punishing Enrique, he expels him nonetheless.

Enrique wants to adapt the story but balks at Ángel's condition to be cast as Zahara, feeling that the Ignacio whom he loved and the Ignacio of today are totally different people. He drives to see Ignacio's mother in Ortigueira, Galicia and learns that the real Ignacio has been dead for four years and that the man who came to his office is actually Ignacio's younger brother, Juan. Enrique's interest is piqued, and he decides to do the film with Juan in the role of Ignacio to find out what drives Juan. Enrique and Ángel start a relationship, and Enrique revises the script so that it ends with Father Manolo, whom Ignacio was trying to blackmail to get money for sex reassignment surgery, having Ignacio murdered. When the scene is shot, Ángel breaks out in tears unexpectedly.

The film set is visited by Manuel Berenguer, who is the real Father Manolo, who has resigned from Church duty. Berenguer confesses to Enrique that the new ending of the film is not far from the truth: the real Ignacio blackmailed Berenguer, who somehow managed to scratch together the money but also took an interest in Ignacio's younger brother, Juan. Juan and Manolo started a relationship and after a while realized they both wanted to see Ignacio dead. Juan scored some very pure heroin, so that his brother would die by overdose after shooting up. After the crime, the relationship disintegrates; Berenguer wants to continue the relationship with Juan, but Juan is uninterested. Berenguer claims that he will never let Juan go, and Juan threatens to kill him if Berenguer continues to pursue him. Berenguer attempts to blackmail Juan for his part in the murder of Ignacio. Enrique is shocked and not at all interested in Juan's weak vindications for what he did to his brother. Finally, before he leaves, Juan gives Enrique a piece of paper: a letter to Enrique that Ignacio was in the middle of typing when he died reading "I think I have succeeded..."

An epilogue states that after the release of the film Juan and Enrique both achieved great success, although Juan was later relegated to television acting after his career declined in the 1990s and killed Berenguer in a hit-and-run because of his continued blackmailing of him.

Cast

Production
García Bernal was required to display a convincing Castilian Spanish accent before being cast.

The New York Times reporter Lynn Hirschberg stated that Bernal had a falling out with Almodovar over the film's content; Bernal denied that assertion. Bernal and Almodóvar had different ideas on the type of 'inner transvestite' in terms of Bernal's performance.

According to Almodóvar, he worked on the screenplay for over 10 years.

Release
The film was theatrically released in Spain on 19 March 2004.
It opened in the 57th Cannes Film Festival in May 2004, the first Spanish film to do so.

Box office
The film opened theatrically in the United States on 19 November 2004 in three venues, earning $147,370 in its opening weekend, ranking number 30 in the domestic box office. At the end of its North American theatrical run (its widest release being in 106 venues), the film had grossed $5,211,842 in the United States and Canada, and $35,062,088 overseas ($7,356,224 in its home country of Spain), making $40,273,930 worldwide.

Critical reception
The film received critical acclaim. Rotten Tomatoes reports that 88% of 146 reviews were positive, with an average rating of 7.60/10. The site's consensus states: "A layered, wonderfully-acted, and passionate drama." On Metacritic, the film has an 81 out of 100 rating, based on 34 critics, indicating "universal acclaim".

Ann Hornaday from The Washington Post wrote, "To watch Bad Education is to revel, along with Almodóvar, in the power of cinema to take us on journeys of breathtaking mystery and dimension and beauty." Marjorie Baumgarten from the Austin Chronicle wrote "With Bad Education, the great Almodóvar delivers the finest movie of his career." Peter Travers from Rolling Stone wrote "A rapturous masterwork." Roger Ebert gave the film three and a half stars out of four writing "Pedro Almodovar's new movie is like an ingenious toy that is a joy to behold, until you take it apart to see what makes it work, and then it never works again. While you're watching it, you don't realize how confused you are, because it either makes sense from moment to moment or, when it doesn't, you're distracted by the sex. Life is like that."

Accolades 

|-
| rowspan = "6" align = "center" | 2005 
| rowspan = "4" | 19th Goya Awards || colspan = "2" | Best Film ||  || rowspan = "4" | 
|-
| Best Director || Pedro Almodóvar || 
|-
| Best Art Direction || Antxón Gómez || 
|-
| Best Production Supervision || Esther García || 
|- 
| rowspan = "2" | 14th Actors and Actresses Union Awards || Best Film Actor in a Leading Role || Gael García Bernal ||  || rowspan = "2" | 
|-
| Best Film Actor in a Minor Role || Javier Cámara || 
|}

See also
 List of Spanish films of 2004
 Catholic sex abuse cases

Further reading

References

External links
 
 
 
 
 

2004 films
2004 independent films
2004 LGBT-related films
2000s coming-of-age drama films
2000s Spanish-language films
2000s Spanish films
2004 crime drama films
2000s mystery drama films
Films set in boarding schools
Films about actors
Films about child sexual abuse
Films about pedophilia
Films about films
Films about sexual repression
Homophobia in fiction
Films about violence against LGBT people
Films about trans women
Films about writers
Films directed by Pedro Almodóvar
Films produced by Agustín Almodóvar
Films scored by Alberto Iglesias
Films set in 1964
Films set in 1977
Films set in 1980
Films set in Madrid
Films shot in Madrid
Films set in Galicia (Spain)
Gay-related films
Latin-language films
LGBT-related coming-of-age films
LGBT-related drama films
Media coverage of Catholic Church sexual abuse scandals
Murder mystery films
Neo-noir
Spanish coming-of-age films
Spanish crime drama films
Spanish independent films
Spanish LGBT-related films
Spanish mystery drama films
El Deseo films